Mehdi Charef (born 21 October 1952) is a French film director and screenwriter of Algerian descent. He has worked on eleven films between 1985 and 2007. His film Le thé au harem d'Archimède was screened in the Un Certain Regard section at the 1985 Cannes Film Festival. Seven years later, his film Au pays des Juliets competed for the Palme d'Or at the 1992 festival.

Filmography
 Le thé au harem d'Archimède (1985)
 Miss Mona (1987)
 Camomille (1988)
 Au pays des Juliets (1992)
 Aime-toi toujours (1995)
 Pigeon volé (1996)
 La maison d'Alexina (1999)
 Marie-Line (2000)
 La fille de Keltoum (2001)
 All the Invisible Children (2005)
 Cartouches Gauloises (2007)
 Graziella (2015)

References

External links

1952 births
Living people
French film directors
French male screenwriters
French screenwriters
French people of Algerian descent
People from Maghnia